The Golden Calf for Best Supporting Actor is a category of the Golden Calf award, presented at the Netherlands Film Festival since 2005. From 2021 onwards the award became a gender-neutral award.

Best Supporting Actor (2005-2020) 
{| class="wikitable"
|+
!Year
!Actor(s)
!Role
!Film
|-
|2005
|Yahya Gaier, Tygo Gernandt, Micha Hulshof, Gürkan Küçüksentürkand Mimoun Oaïssa
|Mo, Goran, Sander, Ali and Amimoen
|Het Schnitzelparadijs
|-
|2006
|Fedja van Huêt
|Marco van der Horst
|Nachtrit
|-
|2007
|Jan Decleir
|Ernst
|Wolfsbergen
|-
|2008
|Ton Kas 
|Nico
|Vox populi
|-
|2009
|Raymond Thiry
|Johan van Beusekom
|Winter in Wartime
|-
|2010
|Jeroen Willems 
|Prince Claus 
|Majesteit
|-
|2011
|Peter Paul Muller 
|Martin Morero 
|Gooische Vrouwen
|-
|2012
|René van 't Hof 
|Gerrit - Plan C
|-
|2013
|Jacob Derwig 
|Dick Tasman 
|Family Way
|-
|2014
|Ton Kas 
|Theo 
|Jongens
|-
|2015
|Raymond Thiry 
|Joop Hazes 
|Bloed, zweet & tranen
|-

|2016
|Marcel Hensema 
|Jozef Mieras 
|In My Father's Garden
|-
|2017
|Mohammed Azaay 
|father 
|Layla M.
|-
|2018
|Wim Opbrouck 
|Wickmayer 
|Cobain
|-
|2019
|Thomas Höppener 
|DJ Dex 
|About That Life
|-
|2020
|Bilal Wahib 
|Youssef 
|Paradise Drifters
|}

 Best Supporting Actress (2005-2020) 

Best Supporting Role
 2021 Yorick van Wageningen as Michaël de Jong in The Judgement
 2022 Tobias Kersloot as Thomas'' in Do Not Hesitate

References

External links
 
 

Best Supporting Actor
Film awards for supporting actor
Film awards for supporting actress